Osikovo Ridge (‘Osikovski Rid’ \o-si-'kov-ski 'rid\) is the ice-covered ridge extending 12 km in south-southeast to north-northwest direction and 3 km wide, with a northern height rising to 1644 and southern one to 2009 m at the head of Darbel Bay on Loubet Coast in Graham Land, Antarctica.  It surmounts McCance Glacier to the west and Widdowson Glacier to the east.

The ridge is named after the settlements of Osikovo in Northeastern, Southern and Southwestern Bulgaria.

Location
British mapping in 1976.

Maps
 Antarctic Digital Database (ADD). Scale 1:250000 topographic map of Antarctica. Scientific Committee on Antarctic Research (SCAR). Since 1993, regularly upgraded and updated.
British Antarctic Territory. Scale 1:200000 topographic map. DOS 610 Series, Sheet W 66 64. Directorate of Overseas Surveys, Tolworth, UK, 1976.

Notes

References
 Bulgarian Antarctic Gazetteer. Antarctic Place-names Commission. (details in Bulgarian, basic data in English)
 Osikovo Ridge. SCAR Composite Antarctic Gazetteer

External links
 Osikovo Ridge. Copernix satellite image

Ridges of Graham Land
Bulgaria and the Antarctic
Loubet Coast